Put Your Love in Me: Love Songs for the Apocalypse is the first greatest hits album released by punk/metal band The Plasmatics in 2002.

While titled a Plasmatics album, it also includes songs from Wendy O. Williams solo career. One point of contention is that these songs are still Plasmatics song as they still feature the two main members of the band, Wendy and Wes Beech. The album contains tracks from all of the bands and Wendy's solo records, except for Coup d'Etat, with half of the songs coming from Wendy's WOW albums.

Track listing
 "Fuck That Booty" – (From the Kommander of Kaos album)
 "Put Your Love in Me" – (From the Coup de Grace album)
 "Fast Food Service" - (From the New Hope for the Wretched album)
 "Bump and Grind" - (From the WOW album)
 "Sex Junkie" - (From the Beyond the Valley of 1984 album)
 "Black Leather Monster" - (From the Metal Priestess EP)
 "Jailbait" - (From the Kommander of Kaos album)
 "Party" - (From the Kommander of Kaos album)
 "I Love Sex (And Rock and Roll)" - (From the WOW album)
 "Dream Lover" - From the New Hope for the Wretched album)
 "The Humpty Song" - (From the Deffest! and Baddest! album)

Plasmatics albums
Albums produced by Dan Hartman
2002 compilation albums